Danjuma Laah Tella (born February 16, 1960) is a Nigerian politician and the senator representing Kaduna South Senatorial district of Kaduna state, at the Nigerian 9th National Assembly.

Political career
Laah had been the senator representing Kaduna south senatorial district since 2015. On February 23, 2019 he was again re-elected into office having garnered 268,287 defeating Yusuf Barnabas Bala of the APC who had 133, 923 votes.

As a senator, he speaks of ways to make peace in southern Kaduna by ensuring that there is no religious barrier between Christians and Muslims.

Bills
Laah sponsored the bills at the Nigerian Senate for the establishment of a federal University within the area of his jurisdiction, which is to be known as:
Federal University of Science and Technology, Manchok.
This he sponsored alongside the bill for the establishment of:
Police College, Tum.

Awards
Laah is a recipient of the DINMA 2009 Award for Accounting when he was serving as the Deputy Director of Finance and Accounts Division at the Federal Capital Territory (FCT) Pension Board, Abuja.

References

1960 births
Living people
Politicians from Kaduna State
Peoples Democratic Party (Nigeria) politicians
21st-century Nigerian businesspeople
21st-century Nigerian politicians
Atyap people